A beer shop (also referred to as a beershop or beer store) is a retail store where beer and other goods related to beer are sold; it is a specialised type of liquor store. Beer shops can be found all around the world, but there are many located in countries where beer is a major cultural product, including Belgium, Canada, Germany, New Zealand, Scandinavian countries, the UK and the US. Beer shops range in size, and may be located along streets or in shopping malls. Beer shops usually offer many different kinds and brands of beer and malt liquors, and may also have a selection of wines, cheeses, and other products. Some shops offer only regional beer brands which are famous or well known in their region. Others offer a wide range of beer from around the world, and some items may fetch fairly high prices, as with fine wines.

Due to the increase of craft brewing companies, many beer shops purvey craft beers from local or international microbreweries, and some such breweries have their own beer shops for selling their own wares and sometimes those of partner breweries, either in regular bottles or in growlers, large, reusable jugs used to transport beer.

Some beer shops also offer beer tastings, homebrewing classes, and speciality goods like beer jam, beer mustard, beer chocolate, craft cheeses, and hop hard liquor. The shops are usually staffed by trained employees, sometimes even beer sommeliers who have a broad knowledge of the topic of beer.

Regulation 

In most places, beer shops require either a full liquor licence or a beer-and-wine-only limited licence, and may only operate during certain hours (typically the same as pubs/bars, or even fewer hours). In some countries, beer shops are more strictly regulated by the government.

In Norway there is also a strict control over the hours at which beer can be sold, and beers above 4.75 ABV are only allowed to be sold by the national monopoly (Vinmonopolet).  In Sweden the national monopoly (Systembolaget) is the only agent allowed to sell any kind of beer, and it even has some degree of control—also argued to be censorship—over the appearance of the labels. At the same time, the EU court sentenced in 2007 that individuals are allowed to order craft beer online within the EU without having to pass through national monopolies.

Somewhat similarly, parts of Canada only permit take-home alcohol sales from province-operated or specially licensed venues; e.g., in Ontario, hard-liquor bottles are only available at government-operated liquor stores, while beer and wine are available at those and at a chain of privately owned shops, an effective monopoly named The Beer Store (however, regularly licensed bars/pubs and many restaurants also provide on-premises alcoholic beverages of all sorts).

See also

Enoteca, a type of speciality wine shop

References

Beer
Retailers by type of merchandise sold
Alcohol distribution retailers